The 2013–14 Greek Football Cup was the 72nd edition of the Greek Football Cup. A total of 46 clubs, 16 less than last edition, were accepted to enter. The competition commenced on 14 September 2013 with the First Round and concluded on 26 April 2014 with the Final at the Olympic Stadium between Panathinaikos and PAOK, with Panathinaikos winning 4–1.

Teams

Calendar

Participating clubs
The following 46 teams competed in First Round (teams in bold are still active in the competition):

Knockout phase
Each tie in the knockout phase, apart from the first two rounds and the final, was played over two legs, with each team playing one leg at home. The team that scored more goals on aggregate over the two legs advanced to the next round. If the aggregate score was level, the away goals rule was applied, i.e. the team that scored more goals away from home over the two legs advanced. If away goals were also equal, then extra time was played. The away goals rule was again applied after extra time, i.e. if there were goals scored during extra time and the aggregate score was still level, the visiting team advanced by virtue of more away goals scored. If no goals were scored during extra time, the winners were decided by a penalty shoot-out. In the first two rounds and the final, which were played as a single match, if the score was level at the end of normal time, extra time was played, followed by a penalty shoot-out if the score was still level.The mechanism of the draws for each round is as follows:
In the draw for the Round of 32, the teams from the first division are seeded and the winners from the first round were unseeded. The seeded teams are drawn against the unseeded teams with the exception of one draw.

In the draws for the Round of 16 onwards, there are no seedings and teams from the different group can be drawn against each other.

First round
The draw for this round took place on 10 September 2013.

Summary

|}

Matches

Bracket

Round of 32
The draw for this round took place on 10 September 2013, after the First Round draw.

Summary

|}

Matches

PAOK won 4–0 on aggregate.

Panathinaikos won 3–1 on aggregate.

Olympiacos won 10–4 on aggregate.

Asteras Tripolis won 1–0 on aggregate.

Niki Volos won 4–1 on penalties.

OFI won 2–1 on aggregate.

Skoda Xanthi won 3–2 on aggregate.

Olympiakos Volos won 1–0 on aggregate.

Asteras Magoula won on away goals.

Iraklis Psachna won 4–3 on aggregate.

Atromitos won 8–0 on aggregate.

Apollon Smyrnis won 3–2 on aggregate.

Aiginiakos won 1–0 on aggregate.

Panionios won 3–1 on aggregate.

Panetolikos won 2–0 on aggregate.

Kalloni won 4–3 on aggregate.

Round of 16
The draw for this round took place on 11 November 2013.

Summary

'

|}

Matches

Panionios won 3–1 on aggregate.

Atromitos won 4–0 on aggregate.

Olympiacos won 5–0 on aggregate.

OFI won 2–1 on aggregate.

Olympiacos Volos won 4–1 on aggregate.

PAOK won 6–1 on aggregate.

Apollon Smyrnis won 3–2 on aggregate.

Panathinaikos won 4–0 on aggregate.

Quarter-finals
The draw for this round took place on 11 November 2013, after the Round of 16 draw.

Summary

|}

Matches

PAOK won 6–0 on aggregate.

OFI won 4–1 on aggregate.

Olympiacos won on away goals.

Panathinaikos won 4–1 on aggregate.

Semi-finals
The draw for this round took place on 11 November 2013, after the quarter-final draw.

Summary

|}

Matches

Panathinaikos won 3–1 on aggregate.

PAOK won on away goals.

Final

Top scorers

References

External links
2013–14 Greek Football Cup at the Greek Football Federation site (Greek)

Greek Football Cup seasons
Cup
Greek Cup